is a passenger railway station in the city of Asahi, Chiba Japan, operated by the East Japan Railway Company (JR East).

Lines

Station layout
The station consists of a two opposed side platforms, connected by a footbridge. The platforms are short, and can accommodate trains of up to eight carriages. The station is staffed.

Platforms

History
Higata Station was opened on 25 February 1898 as a station on the Sōbu Railway for both passenger and freight operations. On 1 September 1907, the Sōbu Railway was nationalised, becoming part of the Japanese Government Railway (JGR). After World War II, the JGR became the Japan National Railways (JNR). Scheduled freight operations were suspended from 1 October 1971. The station was absorbed into the JR East network upon the privatization of the Japan National Railways (JNR) on 1 April 1987.

Passenger statistics
In fiscal 2019, the station was used by an average of 837 passengers daily (boarding passengers only).

Surrounding area
 
 Chiba Prefectural Asahi College of Technology
 Chiba Prefectural Toso Technical High School

See also
 List of railway stations in Japan

References

External links

 JR East station information 

Railway stations in Japan opened in 1898
Railway stations in Chiba Prefecture
Sōbu Main Line
Asahi, Chiba